The Boston metropolitan area has an active Korean American community. The largest groups of Koreans in Massachusetts in 2000 were in Boston, Brookline, Cambridge, Newton, and Somerville.

History
In 1884 a Korean student attending Dummer Academy (now The Governor's Academy) in Byfield, Massachusetts was the first Korean student who was ever enrolled in the USA. In 1907 Syngman Rhee began attending Harvard University. Students in general made up many of the first Koreans in the Boston area. The Korean population of the Boston area was, by 1945, made up of higher education students, Christian missionaries and ministers, and government officials.

Harvard–Yenching Institute began offering PhD fellowships to South Koreans in 1953, leading to the development of the Korean community in the Boston area.

Geography

As of 2010 there were 1,600 ethnic Koreans in Allston and Brighton, making up over one third of the Koreans in Boston. In 2012 Matt Rocheleau of the Boston Globe wrote "Allston is becoming the Koreatown of Boston." The number of Koreans in Allston and Brighton increased 54% from 2000 to 2010. By 2012 Koreans in Allston and Brighton had established various Korean businesses. The neighborhoods' proximity to educational institutions attracted ethnic Koreans.

In addition to the Allston area, as of 2012 there are significant Korean populations in Brookline and Cambridge.

Media
Boston Korea a weekly newspaper, is headquartered in the Allston area of Boston. As of 2012 Myong Sool Chang owns this newspaper. Around 2006 Chang, a Lexington, Massachusetts resident who originated in Seoul and moved to the U.S. in 1998, moved the newspaper offices from Newton, Massachusetts to Allston. Chang stated that the Allston location had a closer proximity to the newspaper's sources and readers than the Newton location.

Institutions
On Thanksgiving Sunday in 1953 Harvard-Yenching Institute visiting professor Dr. Doo Soo Suh and Harvard Law School PhD candidate Dr. Kwang Lim Koh established the Korean Society of Boston. When Suh resigned from his position, Korean students took control of the organization.

Religion
The first Korean Church of Boston held its first services on Thanksgiving Sunday, 1953. Rev. Daesun Park, graduate student Dr. Kwang Lim Koh, and some other Korean graduate students established the church.

References
 Kupel, Nathan James Bae (University of Massachusetts Boston). "Profiles of Asian American Subgroups in Massachusetts: Korean Americans in Massachusetts" (Archive). Institute for Asian American Studies, Paper 24. March 1, 2010.

Notes

Further reading
"Dr. Kwang Lim and Dr. Hesung Chun Koh and the Korean Diaspora in Boston, 1950-1964 (Joint project of the C.G.C.M. and East Rock Institute)." Boston University School of Theology Center of Global Christianity and Mission.
 Watanabe, Paul, Michael Liu, and Shauna Lo (all from the University of Massachusetts Boston and the Institute for Asian American Studies). "ASIAN AMERICANS IN METRO BOSTON: Growth, Diversity, and Complexity" (Archive). May 2004. Prepared for the Metro Boston Equity Initiative of The Harvard Civil Rights Project.

External links
 Korean Cultural Society of Boston
 Korean Church of Boston(PCUSA) (보스톤 한인교회)
 Korean Church of Boston(PCUSA) 

Koreans
Ethnic groups in Boston
History of Boston
Boston